
Gmina Janowiec is a rural gmina (administrative district) in Puławy County, Lublin Voivodeship, in eastern Poland.

Villages
Gmina Janowiec contains the villages and settlements of Brześce, Brześce-Kolonia, Janowice, Janowiec, Nasiłów, Oblasy, Trzcianki and Wojszyn.

Neighbouring gminas
Gmina Janowiec is bordered by the town of Puławy and by the gminas of Kazimierz Dolny, Przyłęk, Puławy and Wilków.

References

Polish official population figures 2006

Janowiec
Puławy County